Judith Nakamura (born November 3, 1960) is an American judge and former chief justice of the New Mexico Supreme Court. She was appointed to the court by Governor Susana Martinez in 2015, and was re-elected in November 2016.

Early life
Nakamura was born and raised in New Mexico. She earned a Bachelor of Arts degree from the University of New Mexico in 1983 and a Juris Doctor from the University of New Mexico School of Law in 1989.

Career 
After graduating from college, she served as a political director for the Republican Party of New Mexico and as a staffer for U.S. Senator Pete Domenici. After law school, Nakamura was an attorney in private practice, and for New Mexico Commissioner of Public Lands.

Judicial career
Nakamura was elected as a judge on the Bernalillo County Metropolitan Court in 1998, and served as Chief Judge of that court from 2002 to 2013. The Albuquerque Bar Association named Nakamura "Judge of the Year" in 2004. Governor Susana Martinez appointed Nakamura to New Mexico's Second Judicial District Court in 2013, and she was re-elected to a new term in 2014.

In 2015, Governor Martinez named Nakamura to the New Mexico Supreme Court to fill the vacancy created by the retirement of Richard C. Bosson. Her appointment gave the supreme court a female majority for the first time. She was sworn in on December 11, 2015. A lawsuit challenging Nakamura's appointment, because she was nominated before her predecessor had actually left office, was dismissed by the courts.

Nakamura was re-elected to a new term on the Supreme Court in November 2016, defeating her Democratic challenger Michael Vigil by 391,000 votes to 361,000 (52% to 48%). Nakamura became the first Republican woman elected to the Court in the state's history, and the first Republican since 1980.

On June 9, 2020, Nakamura announced that she would retire on August 1, but she later postponed her retirement. On December 1, Nakamura officially retired.

Personal life 
Nakamura is an avid balloonist, who serves on the board of the Albuquerque International Balloon Fiesta, which takes place in New Mexico each fall.

See also
List of female state supreme court justices

References

|-

1960 births
Living people
21st-century American judges
21st-century American women judges
Chief Justices of the New Mexico Supreme Court
New Mexico Republicans
Justices of the New Mexico Supreme Court
University of New Mexico alumni
Women chief justices of state supreme courts in the United States